Fyodor Fyodorovich Palitzin (– 19 February 1923) (also known as Palitsyn) was a Russian General who commanded the Russian Expeditionary Force in France.

Palitzin attended the Pavel Military School until 1870, when he moved on to the General Staff Academy. Upon graduation in 1877 he served in the Russo-Turkish War. He was appointed chief of the Main Directorate of the General Staff in June 1905, where he played a role in the military reforms until his resignation in 1908: he disagreed with the subordination of the General Staff to the Ministry of War. However, he retained his seat on the Military Council Initially during the First World War he served on the Northwestern Front. Following the removal of Grand Duke Nicholas Nikolaevich of Russia (1856–1929) from overall command of the Russian Army, Palitzin was reassigned to the Caucasus Army, whence he was then sent to France to lead the Russian Expeditionary Force in France.

References

1851 births
1923 deaths
Imperial Russian Army generals